Pão na chapa is a Brazilian breakfast food, popular in the São Paulo state cuisine. It's a piece of French Bread cut in half and spread in butter, then pressed in the griddle or cooked in a pan. It is also common to spread the bread with requeijão and drink coffee (normally café au lait) alongside it. The exact origins of the food item are uncertain, but it is speculated it was created and popularized in São Paulo City.

References 

Brazilian_cuisine
Breakfast
Breads